The 2nd Siberian Rifle Division was an infantry formation of the Russian Imperial Army.

History 
The division was first formed as the 2nd East Siberian Rifle Brigade in 1883. In 1904 it was expanded into the 2nd East Siberian Rifle Division. The division fought in the Russo-Japanese War. The division was redesignated the 2nd Siberian Rifle Division in 1910. 

In 1914, before the outbreak of World War I, the division's headquarters was located at Razdolnoe. Its 1st Brigade, with the 5th (Nikolsk-Ussuriski) and 6th (Novokievskoe) Siberian Rifle Regiments, was also located at Razdolnoe and its 2nd Brigade, with the 7th (Novokievskoe) and 8th (Barabash) Siberian Rifle Regiments, was headquartered at Novokiyevskoye. The division was part of the 1st Siberian Army Corps.

The division was disbanded in 1918.

Organization
1st Brigade
5th Siberian Rifle Regiment
6th Siberian Rifle Regiment
2nd Brigade
7th Siberian Rifle Regiment
8th Siberian Rifle Regiment
2nd Siberian Rifle Artillery Brigade

References

Infantry divisions of the Russian Empire
Military units and formations established in 1883
Military units and formations disestablished in 1918